Jon St Alban Laurimore (born 1936) is a British actor, known for his television appearances.

His TV credits include The Avengers, The Prisoner, Z-Cars, Dixon of Dock Green, Public Eye, Warship, Sutherland's Law, The Onedin Line, Rock Follies, Space: 1999, Doctor Who (in the serial The Masque of Mandragora), I, Claudius, Target, Secret Army, Reilly, Ace of Spies, Minder, Dalziel and Pascoe and Jack the Ripper. He also appeared as police officers in the films A Touch of the Other (1970) and Die Screaming, Marianne (1971).

He now lives with his family in Suffolk, England.

Personal life
Jon married actress Zoe Hicks in 1959 and they later divorced. In 1963 he married Jill Simonson, who later became a television scriptwriter. They had two children, Sophie Laurimore and Dido Laurimore.

References

External links
 

1936 births
Living people
British male television actors